Slavko Vinčić (born 25 November 1979) is a Slovenian football referee. He has been an international-listed referee for FIFA since 2010. Vinčić went to UEFA Euro 2012 as additional assistant in the team of Damir Skomina.

As of July 2021 he has been in charge of 12 Champions League and 19 Europa League matches, including 2020–21 Champions League quarterfinal between Porto and Chelsea and 2020–21 Europa League semifinal between Arsenal and Villareal.
He was also the referee for the 2022 UEFA Europa League Final between Eintracht Frankfurt and  Rangers.

Vinčić was selected as a match official for Euro 2020, where he refereed two group stage matches (Spain-Sweden and Switzerland-Turkey) and the QF clash between Italy and Belgium.

On 30 May 2020, Vinčić was arrested by mistake as part of a police probe into a prostitution and drugs ring in Bosnia and Herzegovina but was soon cleared of any wrongdoing.

See also
List of football referees

References 

1979 births
Living people
UEFA Europa League referees
Slovenian football referees
UEFA Euro 2020 referees
2022 FIFA World Cup referees
FIFA World Cup referees